Prima (also: The Moscow Human Rights News Agency) was a news agency in Moscow, Russia which distributed human rights-related news in both English and Russian. It had been in form of newspaper in Moscow since 1987 but was founded as an agency in February 2000 and had a website.  Editor-in-chief of Prima information agency was Alexander Podrabinek.

References

External links
  Home page (Wayback Machine: 9 April 2003)
  Home page in English

1987 establishments in Russia
Publications established in 1987
News agencies based in Russia